The 1936 Soviet football championship was the first season conducted between teams (teams of masters) of sports societies and factories (production associations). It was also the seventh in order of primary football competitions in the Soviet Union since 1923 (the Soviet Union was established in 30 December 1922). It was a major transition from a previous season which involved participation of teams representing cities and republics composed of better players of that city or republics teams. The decision about conducting the first Soviet championship among teams of sports societies and factories was adopted by the All-Union Council of Physical Culture (VSFK) of the Soviet Union Central Executive Committee (Soviet Parliament). On 21 June 1936 the VSFK was liquidated and replaced with the All-Union Committee of Physical Culture and Sports (VKFKS) of the Soviet Union Sovnarkom (Soviet Government).

Format and structure
The idea of new competition was announced on 21 March 1936 in the Russian newspaper "Krasnyi Sport" (Moscow) No. 41 (246). Note that "Krasnyi Sport" was the official publication of the All-Union Council (later Committee) of Physical Culture of the Soviet Union. The decision was adopted as beneficial by the March 27 session of the presidium of the All-Union Council of Physical Culture. The season was split into two championships with a cup competition between them that took place in August 1936. The first part (considered spring) started in late May and finished by mid of July with a single match played by each participant against each other (round-robin format). The same format was resumed in the fall that started in September finishing before November. Between first and second halves it was decided to conduct separate competition in elimination format which became the Soviet Cup. The main contenders for the title appeared to be the Moscow's Spartak and Dynamo.

The official format was announced by "Krasnyi Sport" on 11 May 1936 just couple of weeks before the start of the season on 24 May. It was stated that the spring championship is composed of three groups A, B, V and indicated what teams in which group. It also mentioned that each team would have a 22 players roster and players of those teams do not have rights transfer to other teams during the year. Each group was accounted of 7 teams. Krasnyi Sport stated that composition of the autumn championship would be determined on results of the spring championship. The points system was calculated in a following manner: 3 points for a win, 2 for a tie, 1 for a loss, no points was awarded for failing to appear for a game. The seasons' regulations also provided that in case of tie for the first position there would be organized additional "championship" game between tied teams. In case of other teams would tie for certain position, for the tiebreaker was used ratio of goals scored to allowed which was common tiebreak calculation throughout Europe at that time. About the use of goal ratio as a tiebreaker is also mentioned in the "Chronicles of Aksel Vartanian" that referenced to another Soviet journalist and sports researcher of football Aleksandr Perel. The same chronicles also state that originally there was supposed to have been a promotion-relegation play-off between the last placed team of the Group A (top tier) and the winner of the Group B (second tier). The play-off game was eventually canceled and the winner of Group B was simply admitted to Group A for the next season (same year, autumn half). According to Vartanian in his own opinion, the goal ratio as a tiebreaker may have not been the case as previously thought and possibly the reason why the promotion-relegation play-off was canceled.

The Soviet championship winner was awarded the Red Banner of the All-Union Committee.

Teams
Teams selection for the competition is not clearly determined. For the first championship were selected four Muscovite teams that previously competed in the 1935 Moscow football championship, two Leningrad teams that previously competed in the 1935 Leningrad football championship and a winner of the 1935 Ukrainian Dynamo football championship (Dynamomania). From Ukraine to the league was admitted the most politically reliable squad. Before the game between Dynamo Moscow and Spartak Moscow on 11 July 1936, "Krasnyi Sport" named it the focal game of the competition and mentioned their previous meetings as part of the Moscow football championship. Just before the season started the Muscovite team Kazanka changed its name to Lokomotiv Moscow upon establishment of the Lokomotiv sport society. It should be mentioned that parallel to the Soviet football championship, there also existed a separate competition that sometimes would coincide with primary football competition and was known as the games of three cities (or games of three capitals) including teams of Moscow, Leningrad and Kharkiv. The 1936 season in Group A also involved teams from only three cities Moscow, Leningrad and capital of Ukraine.

Spring

Overview
The first game of the championship took place on May 22, 1936 two days before the official opening day announced earlier with the match FC Dynamo Leningrad - FC Lokomotiv Moscow on the Dynamo Stadium in Leningrad that ended in 3:1 win for the Leningrad team. The spring half finished on July 17, 1936, with two games in Moscow and Leningrad. The decisive game that guaranteed the title for Dynamo Moscow took place on July 11, 1936, when they beat Spartak 1:0 at Dynamo Stadium (Moscow). The host team for that game was considered to be Spartak. Please, also note that FC Krasnaya Zaria won a match against their city-mates FC Dynamo 1:0 at Dynamo Stadium (Leningrad) on June 5, 1936.

League standings

Results

Round by round
The following table is a historic representation of the team's position in the standings after the completion of each round.

Top scorers
6 goals
 Mikhail Semichastny (Dynamo Moscow)

5 goals
 Vasily Pavlov (Dynamo Moscow)
 Vasily Smirnov (Dynamo Moscow)

4 goals
 Georgi Glazkov (Spartak Moscow)
 Makar Honcharenko (Dynamo Kiev)
 Sergei Ilyin (Dynamo Moscow)
 Pavlo Komarov (Dynamo Kiev)
 Konstantin Shchegotsky (Dynamo Kiev)

3 goals
 Viktor Lavrov (Lokomotiv Moscow)
 Mykola Makhinya (Dynamo Kiev)
 Pyotr Nikiforov (Spartak Moscow)
 Yevgeni Shelagin (CDKA Moscow)

Medal squads
(league appearances and goals listed in brackets)

Stadiums
 Dynamo Stadium Krestovsky Island, Leningrad (Dynamo)
 Stadium of CDKA Sokolniki, Moscow (CDKA)
 Balitsky Dynamo Stadium Kiev (Dynamo)
 Dynamo Stadium Moscow (Dynamo, Spartak)
 Red Triangle Stadium Leningrad (Krasnaya Zaria)
 Lokomotiv Stadium Moscow (Lokomotiv) (called Stalinets at first)
 Lenin Stadium Leningrad (Krasnaya Zaria)

Note: Balitsky was Narkom of NKVD, later was executed during the Great Purge.

Autumn

Overview
This tournament was exact replica of the spring championship by the format of the competition, including the nomination of points. The Georgian FC Dynamo Tbilisi was admitted to the League expanding it to eight teams. The defending champion was FC Dynamo Moscow.

It opened with two games in Leningrad and Moscow on September 5, 1936, soon after the Soviet Cup final that took place just week prior to that on August 28. The season concluded on October 30, 1936, with three games in Moscow, Leningrad, and Tbilisi. It was then when Spartak Moscow by beating CDKA at their home turf (CSKA Stadium) passed Dinamo Moscow in rankings to obtain the first place and with it the first national title.

League standings

Results

Round by round
The following table is a historic representation of the team's position in the standings after the completion of each round.

Top scorers
7 goals
 Georgi Glazkov (Spartak Moscow)

6 goals
 Mikhail Berdzenishvili (Dinamo Tbilisi)
 Sergei Ilyin (Dynamo Moscow)
 Viktor Lavrov (Lokomotiv Moscow)
 Boris Paichadze (Dinamo Tbilisi)
  (Spartak Moscow)

5 goals
 Mikhail Kireyev (Lokomotiv Moscow)
 Vasili Smirnov (Dynamo Moscow)
 Pyotr Terenkov (Lokomotiv Moscow)

4 goals
 Nikolai Makhinya (Dynamo Kiev)
 Viktor Shylovsky (Dynamo Kiev)
 Mikhail Yakushin (Dynamo Moscow)

Medal squads
(league appearances and goals listed in brackets)

Stadiums
 Lenin Stadium Leningrad (Dynamo, Krasnaya Zaria)
 Stadium of CDKA Sokolniki, Moscow (CDKA)
 Balitsky Dinamo Stadium Kiev (Dynamo)
 Dynamo Stadium Aeroport, Moscow (Dynamo, Spartak)
 Lokomotiv Stadium Preobrazhenskoye, Moscow (Lokomotiv, CDKA) (Preobrazhenskoye is next to Sokolniki)
 Dynamo Stadium Tbilisi (Dynamo)

See also
 1936 Group B (Soviet football championship) – second tier
 1936 Group V (Soviet football championship) – third tier
 1936 Group G (Soviet football championship) – fourth tier
 1936 Soviet Cup

References

External links
 Soviet Union - List of final tables (RSSSF)

Soviet Top League seasons
1
Soviet
Soviet